The Indianapolis Chamber Orchestra (ICO) is a nonprofit chamber orchestra headquartered at Butler University in Indianapolis, Indiana.  In 2019-2020 it will celebrate its 35th season.

History
The orchestra was founded by musicologist David Urness and originally named "Musicians of the Cloister" after the cloister garden at Trinity Episcopal Church in Indianapolis. Urness modeled ICO after the Academy of St Martin in the Fields.

The orchestra was incorporated in 1985 and adopted its current name in 1987. In 2004 the orchestra merged with Indianapolis Youth Wind Ensemble as part of an ongoing outreach program.

The 1985 concert season featured performances at Indiana Repertory Theatre. During the 1986-87 season, the orchestra performed at the Indianapolis Museum of Art. Then in 1988, the orchestra moved to Clowes Memorial Hall at Butler University.

Currently the orchestra performs at Howard L. Schrott Center for the Arts.

Music director Kirk Trevor joined the ICO in 1988 and retired at the end of the 2014-15 season.

In July 2015, Matthew Kraemer was named as Music Director and Principal Conductor.

About the Indianapolis Chamber Orchestra 
The Indianapolis Chamber Orchestra (ICO) reaches more than 30,000 people annually through its seven-concert series, arts partner services, education/outreach programs, and radio broadcast. 

In addition to Music Director and Principal Conductor Matthew Kraemer, James Aikman serves as Composer-in-Residence.

The ICO is professional Orchestra-in-Residence at the Howard L. Schrott Center for the Arts, Butler Arts Center, a perfect venue for the ICO in terms of size, acoustics, location and aesthetic ambiance, and the production capabilities to open up new possibilities for artistic programming.

Composed of 34 professional musicians, the Indianapolis Chamber Orchestra advances and promotes music composed for the small orchestra through professional concert performances and education and outreach programs. Each year the ICO  presents a concert series that features internationally recognized guest artists, superior local talent, and aspiring young soloists, and showcases the talents of living composers.  The ICO's artistic programming uses innovative program formats and intimate concert venues. The ICO takes an active role in perpetuating the art form by commissioning and presenting works of living composers, as well as presenting venerable masterworks. The ICO has the distinction of performing several world and American premieres.

The orchestra also accompanies the Indianapolis Opera, the International Violin Competition of Indianapolis, the American Pianists Association, and the Indianapolis Symphonic Choir.  

A weekly ICO radio broadcast on WFYI, 90.1 FM expands the concert experience by featuring selections from ICO concerts and interviews with the Maestro and guest artists.  In 2017 the ICO was featured on the PBS concert “A Festival of Carols with Sylvia McNair.”  Peacemakers, premiered in 2016, became the subject of an Emmy Award-winning PBS documentary in 2017. In May 2015, the ICO released its first commercial CD, Momentum 21. While Momentum 21 is a milestone in the ICO's growth and development, it also speaks of the forward momentum and direction of contemporary music composed for chamber orchestra, and of the dynamic talent that is adding to the body of music literature in the 21st century.

In 2018-2019 the ICO served its twelfth year as Orchestra-in-Residence for the Indiana State Contemporary Music Festival.  Through its affiliation with this three-day immersive educational event, the ICO sponsors a nation-wide competition for the composition of new works for chamber orchestra. In 2016 the ICO collaborated nationally with the American Composers Orchestra “EarShot” program to be the first chamber orchestra to present new orchestral works by five emerging American composers.

The ICO offers a full range of education and outreach programs for all ages.  ICO FUNtastic Classics and Residency programs take ICO musicians into area schools for live programs or classroom coaching.  ICO Concert Connections brings area youth to ICO concerts.

Each summer the ICO partners with Indy Parks to present a free, family-friendly parks concert.

The ICO’s administrative offices are located at Butler University. Operating support comes from private and government granting agencies, and corporate and individual contributors who appreciate the ICO’s place in Indianapolis’ multi-dimensional cultural climate. The ICO is governed by a Board of Directors drawn from the professional and business communities. The ICO has professionally managed endowed funds valued at $2 million (as of December 31, 2017).

References

External links
 ICO YouTube channel

1984 establishments in Indiana
Performing arts in Indiana
Chamber orchestras
Non-profit organizations based in Indianapolis
Tourist attractions in Indianapolis
Butler University